is a Japanese professional shogi player, ranked 8-dan.

Nakata's nickname is コーヤン Kōyan, after the on'yomi reading of his first name.

Theoretical contributions
The Kōyan variation (コーヤン流 Kōyan-ryū) of Third File Rook is named after him. In particular, his development of the so-called "Isao Nakata XP" is a very popular Third File Rook quick attack countermeasure against Static Rook Anaguma.

Promotion history
Nakata's promotion history is as follows:

 6-kyū: 1980
 1-dan: 1983
 4-dan : April 30, 1986
 5-dan: March 6, 1990
 6-dan: August 7, 1998
 7-dan: October 11, 2005
 8-dan: January 21, 2019

Awards and honors
Nakata received the Japan Shogi Association's "25 Years Service Award" in 2011 in recognition of being an active professional for twenty-five years.

References

External links
ShogiHub: Professional Player Info · Nakata, Isao
Lectures on the Latest Strategies: Chapter 8: Koyan Style

1967 births
Japanese shogi players
Living people
Professional shogi players
People from Fukuoka
Professional shogi players from Fukuoka Prefecture